The 1977–78 Hellenic Football League season was the 25th in the history of the Hellenic Football League, a football competition in England.

Premier Division

The Premier Division featured 13 clubs which competed in the division last season, along with three new clubs, promoted from Division One:
Abingdon United
Didcot Town
Flackwell Heath

League table

Division One

The Division One featured 12 clubs which competed in the division last season, along with 4 new clubs:
Hazells, relegated from the Premier Division
Lambourn Sports, joined from the North Berks Football League
Ruislip Town
Brackley Town, joined from the North Bucks & District Football League

League table

References

External links
 Hellenic Football League

1977-78
8